Orthophytum fosterianum is a plant species in the genus Orthophytum. This species is endemic to Brazil.

Cultivars
 Orthophytum 'Clouds'

References

BSI Cultivar Registry Retrieved 11 October 2009

fosterianum
Flora of Brazil